This is a list of films produced by the Tollywood film industry based in Hyderabad in the year 1955. Movies released 24

References 

1955
Telugu
Telugu films